Nehal Saafan (born 10 September 1996) is an Egyptian synchronized swimmer. She competed in the women's team event at the 2016 Summer Olympics. and the 2020 summer Olympics

References

1996 births
Living people
Egyptian synchronized swimmers
Olympic synchronized swimmers of Egypt
Synchronized swimmers at the 2016 Summer Olympics
Synchronized swimmers at the 2020 Summer Olympics
Place of birth missing (living people)
Artistic swimmers at the 2019 World Aquatics Championships
Artistic swimmers at the 2022 World Aquatics Championships